Rajiv Gandhi College of Engineering and Technology  (commonly known as RGCET) is a premier private engineering institute located in Puducherry, India under Sri Balaji Educational and Charitable Public Trust, and affiliated to Pondicherry University.

Location 

Pondicherry is 150 km from Chennai. It is well connected by road and rail. The nearest airport is Pondicherry Airport and the railway station is Pondicherry. The Aurobindo Ashram, Auroville and Manakkula Vinayagar Temple are located in the Union Territory, well known for its weather and conducive learning atmosphere.

Departments 

Courses offered are:
 Undergraduate
 Engineering & Technology
 Bio Medical Engineering
 Computer Science & Engineering
 Electrical and Electronics Engineering
 Electronics and Communication Engineering
 Information Technology
 Mechanical Engineering
 Post Graduate
 Master of Business Administration
 Master of Computer Applications
 M.TECH(Wireless Communication)
 M.TECH(Computer Science)

External links 
 official website of RGCET
 Official website of SBECT

All India Council for Technical Education
Engineering colleges in Puducherry